Cetrelia sayanensis is a species of foliose lichen in the family Parmeliaceae. Found in Europe, it was formally described as a new species in 2009 by lichenologists Tatyana Otnyukova, Nikolay Stepanov, and John Alan Elix. The type was collected along the Kulumys ridge on the West Sayan Mountains of southern Siberia. In 2019, the lichen was recorded from Austria, its first reported occurrence in middle Europe.

The upper thallus surface is somewhat shiny, and has pseudocyphellae, pustules, and soredia. Its ascospores are ellipsoid to roughly spherical, measuring 12–16 by 10–12 μm.

Cetrelia sayanensis is similar to other Cetrelia species that produce soredia, including C. cetrarioides, C. chicitae, C. olivetorum, and C. monachorum. Unlike these species, however, C. sayanensis have pustulate-capitate soralia, meaning that the soralia arise from pustules (blister-like bumps) on the thallus surface. The major secondary compound of C. sayanensis is imbricaric acid, while minor compounds include atranorin, perlatolic acid, divaricatic acid, and anziaic acid.

References

Parmeliaceae
Lichen species
Lichens described in 2009
Taxa named by John Alan Elix
Lichens of Central Europe
Lichens of Siberia